Sharon Prabhakar (born 4 August 1955) is an Indian pop singer, theatre personality and public speaker.

Personal life
Prabhakar was born to a Punjabi father who was a public servant, and a Christian mother who was a music teacher. Along with her brother and sister, she had a mixed upbringing, growing up speaking both Punjabi and English.

When she was in her twenties, she married Bryan Mascarenhas, though they later divorced.

In 1986 Prabhakar married Alyque Padamsee, with whom she has a daughter, Shazahn Padamsee. The couple have since separated.

Background
In the past, Prabhakar has been referred to by India Today as one of Bombay's most talented folk singers with a style reminiscent of Joan Baez. By the mid-1980s, she achieved recognition and fame for singing in popular overseas styles in Hindi language. According to an article in The Hindustan Times, even before artists such as Alisha Chinai, Baba Sehgal and Daler Mehndi were described as Indi-pop, she was the original pop star of Hindi music that wasn't related to films. She achieved popularity in Hindi pop and disco. During her career, she has shared the stage with Celine Dion, represented India abroad and sung for members of the White House.

Music career

1980s to 1990s
Prabhakar had involvement in the production of Obsession '77, an album by psychedelic and hard rock band Atomic Forest.

In 1980, her album Feeling Good was released on the Polydor label.

Sharon also had sung an English song for a Kannada movie. The song is I wake up in the middle of the night for the movie : Udayavagali cheluva namma Kannada naadu 
Record Label The Gramophone Company of India Limited
Record number :7EPE 11504

2000s
In 2007, her album Dilrooba was released via Raga to Rock. In January 2019, Prabhakar was performing at the SoBo Festival. She invited politician Milind Deora to come up on stage and perform with her. Milind is a musician in his own right and a blues guitarist.

Discography

Web series

References

External links 

Living people
Indian women pop singers
1955 births